The Colonial Athletic Association Men's Basketball Coach of the Year is a basketball award given to the most outstanding men's basketball head coach in the Colonial Athletic Association, as chosen by a panel of sports writers and broadcasters. The award was first given following the 1983–84 season, the first year of the conference's existence, to Joe Harrington of George Mason and Dick Tarrant of Richmond. Tarrant and Bruiser Flint of Drexel have won the most awards with four, while six other coaches have won the award twice.

Key

Winners

Winners by school

See also
List of coaches in the Naismith Memorial Basketball Hall of Fame

Footnotes

References

NCAA Division I men's basketball conference coaches of the year
Coach of the Year
Awards established in 1984